Victor Jay Kemper (born April 14, 1927) is an American retired cinematographer.

Life and career 
Kemper was born in Newark, New Jersey, the son of Florence (née Freedman) and Louis Kemper. He is a graduate of Seton Hall University.

As a cinematographer, Kemper collaborated extensively with director Arthur Hiller. Kemper worked with the leading directors of the 1970s including John Cassavetes, Sidney Lumet, Anthony Harvey, Michael Ritchie, Ulu Grosbard, Peter Yates, Karel Reisz, Elaine May, J. Lee Thompson, Elia Kazan, George Roy Hill, Robert Wise, Carl Reiner, Bob Rafelson, Irvin Kershner, Richard Attenborough, and Norman Jewison.

He is a member of the American Society of Cinematographers (ASC), and was its president twice, from 1993 to 1996, and from 1999 to 2001.

Filmography 

The Tiger Makes Out (1967)
Alice's Restaurant (1969)
The Magic Garden of Stanley Sweetheart (1970)
Husbands (1970)
They Might Be Giants (1971)
Who Is Harry Kellerman and Why Is He Saying Those Terrible Things About Me? (1971)
The Hospital (1971)
The Candidate (1972)
Last of the Red Hot Lovers (1972)
Shamus (1973)
The Friends of Eddie Coyle (1973)
Gordon's War (1973)
From the Mixed-Up Files of Mrs. Basil E. Frankweiler (1973)
The Gambler (1974)
The Reincarnation of Peter Proud (1975)
Dog Day Afternoon (1975)
Stay Hungry (1976)
The Last Tycoon (1976)
Mikey and Nicky (1976) 
Slap Shot (1977)
Audrey Rose (1977)
The Prince of Central Park (1977, TV)
Oh, God! (1977)
Coma (1978)
The One and Only (1978)
Eyes of Laura Mars (1978)
Magic (1978)
...And Justice for All (1979)
The Jerk (1979)
Night of the Juggler (1980)
The Final Countdown (1980)
Xanadu (1980)
The Four Seasons (1981)
Chu Chu and the Philly Flash (1981)
Partners (1982)
Author! Author! (1982)
Mr. Mom (1983)
National Lampoon's Vacation (1983)
The Lonely Guy (1984)
Cloak and Dagger (1984)
Secret Admirer (1985)
National Lampoon's European Vacation (1985)
Pee-wee's Big Adventure (1985)
Clue (1985)
Kojak: The Price of Justice (1987, TV)
Walk Like a Man (1987)
Hot to Trot (1988)
Cohen and Tate (1988)
See No Evil, Hear No Evil (1989)
Crazy People (1990)
F/X2 (1991)
Another You (1991)
Married to It (1991)
Beethoven (1992)
Tommy Boy (1995)
Eddie (1996)
Jingle All the Way (1996)
Too Rich: The Secret Life of Doris Duke (1999, TV)
On Golden Pond (2001, TV)
American Pie Presents: Band Camp (2005)
Bring It On: All or Nothing (2006)

Awards and nominations

References

External links 
 

1927 births
American cinematographers
Possibly living people
People from Newark, New Jersey
Seton Hall University alumni